Wind chill is a meteorological effect.

Windchill may refer to:

 Wind Chill (film), 2007 horror film
 Windchill (software), PLM application
 Windchill (G.I. Joe), a fictional character in the G.I. Joe universe